Pijl is a Dutch surname. Notable people with the surname include:

Kees Pijl (1897–1976), Dutch footballer
Kees van der Pijl (born 1947), Dutch political scientist and professor

Dutch-language surnames